The 2003 County Championship season, known as the Frizzell County Championship, was the 103rd County Championship. It was contested through two divisions: Division One and Division Two. Each team played all the others in their division both home and away. The top three teams from Division Two were promoted to the first division for the 2004 season, while the bottom three sides from Division 1 were relegated.

Division One

Standings
12 points for a win
6 points for a tie
4 points for a draw
4 points for an abandoned game
A maximum of 5 batting bonus points and 3 bowling bonus points

Division two

Standings

References

County Championship, 2003
County Championship seasons